Thomas Brandt (born February 23, 1990) is an American soccer player who played for the Harrisburg City Islanders in the USL Professional Division.

External links
 University of Pennsylvania bio

1990 births
Living people
American soccer players
Penn Quakers men's soccer players
Penn FC players
USL Championship players
Philadelphia Union draft picks
Soccer players from Pennsylvania
Association football defenders